The name Sancho is an Iberian name of Basque origin (Santxo, Santzo, Santso, Antzo, Sans). Sancho stems from the Latin name Sanctius. The feminine form is Sancha and the common patronymic is Sánchez.

Outside the Spanish-speaking world, the name is especially associated with the literary character Sancho Panza.

Kings of Navarre
Sancho I
Sancho II
Sancho III
Sancho IV
Sancho V (also king of Aragon)
Sancho VI
Sancho VII

Kings of León and Castile
Sancho I (León)
Sancho II (León and Castille)
Sancho III (Castille)
Sancho IV (León and Castille)

Kings of Portugal
Sancho I, o Povoador
Sancho II, o Capelo

King of Majorca
Sancho

Dukes of Gascony
Sancho I
Sancho II
Sancho III
Sancho IV
Sancho V
Sancho VI

Counts of Castille
Sancho García

Other historical figures
Abd al-Rahman Sanchuelo
Sancho (bishop of Jaca)
Sancho, Count of Provence
Sancho I of Astarac
Sancho Alfónsez
Sanciolo d'Aragona
Sancho of Aragon (archbishop of Toledo)
Sancho Manoel de Vilhena
Sancho Nunes de Barbosa
Sancho Gracia
Sancho Ramirez
Sancho Ramírez of Viguera
Sancho Ramírez, Count of Ribagorza
Sancho Sánchez
Jadon Sancho
Juan Bautista Sancho
 Ignatius Sancho, 18th century British composer, actor, and writer.
 'Sancho', a nickname for philosopher Max Stirner in Marx and Engel's The German Ideology

Fictional
Sancho Panza

Other
Brent Sancho, a Trinidadian footballer and politician
Charles Ignatius Sancho, a British abolitionist, writer and composer.
Jadon Sancho, an English footballer
The War of the Three Sanchos, an 11th century conflict between the three first cousins Jímenez kings: Sancho II of Castile, Sancho IV of Navarre, and Sancho Ramírez of Aragon, all grandsons of Sancho the Great in Northern Spain.

References 

Basque masculine given names